"Forgive Her..." is a CD single by Swallow the Sun, released in 2005 by Firebox Records. The single was released only in Finland, where it reached number 4 in the charts. Guest vocals by Albert Witchfinder of the Finnish doom metal band Reverend Bizarre were featured on the song "Solitude", a cover of Candlemass.

Track listing
 "Forgive Her..." – 9:02
 "Solitude" (Candlemass cover) – 6:04

References

2005 singles
2005 songs